Jalan Balakong, Federal Route 3211 (formerly Selangor state route B51), is an industrial federal road in Selangor, Malaysia.

At most sections, the Federal Route 3211 was built under the JKR R5 road standard, allowing maximum speed limit of up to 90 km/h.

There is one overlap: E18 Kajang Dispersal Link Expressway – Mines–Balakong.

List of junctions

References

Malaysian Federal Roads